Eubordeta is a genus of moths in the family Geometridae described by Rothschild in 1904.

Species
 Eubordeta eichhorni Rothschild, 1904
 Eubordeta flammea Jordan, 1912
 Eubordeta flammens Bethune-Baker, 1910

References

Geometridae